Alister Smart (born 1934/1935) also credited as Alastair Smart,  is an Australian retired TV presenter, singer, actor and television director, mainly of soap opera/serials and telemovies, with numerous credits from the late 1950s until retiring in 1994.

Smart started his career in theatre roles from 1957, but is best known for his long tenure as a presenter on TV children's series Play School and appeared with fellow members of Play School on tie-in records released for ABC Music.

Career

Presenter and actor
When the British-based children's series Play School started its run in Australia in 1966, Smart was an original presenter. He was the longest-serving original, remaining for 25 years, until he left in 1990. As one of six original presenters, he shared the role with fellow presenters Lorraine Bayly, Anne Haddy, Diane Dorgan, Donald McDonald, and Kerrie Francis.

He has appeared in guest roles in soap opera and made for TV movies from the early 1960s onwards You Can't See 'round Corners, Homicide. Division 4, The Sullivans and Cop Shop.

Smart, although not a staple of the regular Number 96 television series, had a prominent role as journalist Duncan Hunter in the film version. The storyline sees him married to Sonia Vansard (Lynn Rainbow) who has returned to live at the building and questioning her new found sanity after having departed from the series with a mental illness.

He's roles in theatre include Shakespeare's, Macbeth and King Henry V and a tour of Who's Afraid of Virginia Woolf

TV director
His directing work, encompassing TV movies and TV series from the early 1970s until retiring in 1994, includes the series Scattergood: Friend of All, Sons and Daughters, Richmond Hill, Prisoner and Blue Heelers.

Personal life
Smart who grew  up in Nowra, New South Wales, currently resides in East Gippsland, Victoria

Filmography

Actor

Presenter

Director

References

External links
 

Australian television directors
Living people
Australian children's television presenters
Australian male television actors
1934 births